Chhantyal is spoken by approximately 2,000 of the 10,000 ethnic Chhantyal in Nepal. Chhantyal is spoken in the Kali Gandaki River valley of Myagdi District; there are also ethnic Chantel in Baglung District (Ethnologue).

The Chhantyal language is a member of the Tamangic group (along with Gurung, Thakali, Manangba, Nar-Phu and Tamang) of the Sino-Tibetan family. Within its group, it is lexically and grammatically closest to Thakali.

References

External links
The Chantyal language and people
The Chantyal language by Michael Noonan
The fall and rise and fall of the Chantyal language by Michael Noonan

Languages of Nepal
Tamangic languages